László Bartha (19 March 1925 – 4 July 1982) was a Hungarian sprinter. He competed in the men's 100 metres at the 1948 Summer Olympics.

Competition record

References

1925 births
1982 deaths
Athletes (track and field) at the 1948 Summer Olympics
Hungarian male sprinters
Olympic athletes of Hungary
Place of birth missing